Roxana Mehran is an Iranian-American cardiologist and Mount Sinai Endowed Professor of Medicine at the Icahn School of Medicine at Mount Sinai. She is known for her work in interventional cardiology.

Early life and education 
Mehran was born in Tehran, Iran, before coming to the United States. She earned a bachelor's degree in chemistry from New York University in 1983. She earned her M.D. from St. George's University School of Medicine in Grenada, West Indies in 1987. From 1988 until 1991, Mehran completed her residency training in the internal medicine program at University of Connecticut School of Medicine in Hartford, CT, where she served as chief resident. She completed cardiology (1991 to 1994) and interventional cardiology (1994 until 1995) fellowships at Mount Sinai Medical Center in New York City.

Medical career 
Mehran held appointments at Columbia University Irving Medical Center and Washington Hospital Center before moving to Mount Sinai School of Medicine. As of 2021, she is a professor of medicine, cardiology, and population health science and policy at the Icahn School of Medicine at Mount Sinai, a position she has held since 2010. In 2019, she was honored as the Mount Sinai Professor in Cardiovascular Clinical Research and Outcomes.

Mehran advocates for women in medicine with a focus on her field of cardiology, including a study in The Lancet that showed a lack of gender-specific research related to women's heart health. She co-founded Women as One, an organization dedicated to the advancement of women physicians, and in 2020, she was named lead commissioner for The Lancets Commission on Women and Cardiovascular Disease. She was a founding physician of the Cardiovascular Research Foundation, New York City, in 2000.

Selected publications 
As of 2021, Mehran has been cited over 200,000 times and has an h-index of 163.

Awards and honors
Bernadine Healy Leadership in Women's CV Disease Distinguished Award (2017)
Master interventionalists of the Society for Cardiovascular Angiography & Interventions (2017)
Nanette Wenger Award for Excellence in Medical Leadership (2018)
Andreas Gruntzig Award and Silver Medal of the European Society of Cardiology (2019)
Ellis Island Medal of Honor (2019)

References

External links 
 

Year of birth missing (living people)
Living people
Physicians from Tehran
Women cardiologists
Iranian cardiologists
Icahn School of Medicine at Mount Sinai faculty
Iranian women physicians
21st-century Iranian women
20th-century Iranian women
New York University alumni